Kosŏng County is a kun, or county, in Kangwŏn province, North Korea.  It lies in the southeasternmost corner of North Korea, immediately north of the Korean Demilitarized Zone.  Prior to the end of the Korean War in 1953, it made up a single county, together with what is now the South Korean county of the same name.  In a subsequent reorganization, the county absorbed the southern portion of Tongch'ŏn county.

Physical features

Kosŏng is largely mountainous, but there is flat land along the coast of the Sea of Japan to the county's east. The mountains here are part of the Taebaek range.  A portion of Kŭmgangsan mountain is included in the county.

Climate

Administrative divisions
Kosŏng county is divided into 1 ŭp (town) and 23 ri (villages):

Economy
The local economy is dominated by agriculture, although fishing also plays a role, together with the harvesting of brown seaweed and clams. Significant local crops include rice, maize, soybeans, wheat, and barley. It is particularly well known as a source for bamboo handicrafts.

Transport
Rail
Nearly half the length of the Kŭmgangsan Ch'ŏngnyŏn line of the Korean State Railway is in Kosŏng county. It is operational as far south as Kŭmgangsan Ch'ŏngnyŏn station. From there. the line continues south to Samilp'o and Kamho stations (both in North Korea, but not in regular use), thence across the DMZ to connect to Korail's Tonghae Pukpu line at Jejin.

The section between Kŭmgangsan Ch'ŏngnyŏn and Jejin stations was out of service from the partition of Korea until 2007, when it was reopened for passenger trains from the South to the Mount Kŭmgang Tourist Region; it was closed again after the shooting of a South Korean tourist by a KPA soldier.

Sea
The nearest major port is Wŏnsan.

See also
Geography of North Korea
Administrative divisions of North Korea
Kumgangsan

References

External links

Counties of Kangwon Province (North Korea)
Port cities and towns in North Korea